Donato Squicciarini (24 April 1927 – 5 March 2006) was an Italian Catholic archbishop who acted as Nuncio to Austria from 1989 to 2002. 

Squicciarini was born at Altamura, Apulia on 24 April 1927. He was ordained priest 12 April 1952, and ordained bishop and titular Archbishop of Tiburnia 26 Nov 1978. He was Apostolic Pro-Nuncio to Gabon, Cameroun, and Equatorial Guinea from 1981 till 1989, and Apostolic Nuncio to Austria  from 1 July 1989 until retirement on 8 October 2002.    

He was involved in a controversy about an Order of Pius IX conferred on Kurt Waldheim. Donato Squicciarini received the "Austrian Decoration of Honor" in 2000. He died in Rome on 5 March 2006.

References 

1927 births
2006 deaths
People from Altamura
Apostolic Nuncios to Burundi
20th-century Italian Roman Catholic titular archbishops
21st-century Italian Roman Catholic titular archbishops
Officers Crosses of the Order of Merit of the Federal Republic of Germany
Apostolic Nuncios to Austria
Apostolic Nuncios to Gabon
Apostolic Nuncios to Cameroon
Apostolic Nuncios to Equatorial Guinea
Italian expatriates in Austria
Italian expatriates in Cameroon
Italian expatriates in Gabon
Italian expatriates in Equatorial Guinea